Sun Group is one of the largest real estate developers in Vietnam. Its main activities are the development of holiday resorts, attraction parks and luxury real estate.

Sun Group was founded in 2007 by four Vietnamese who lived in the former Soviet Union. One of them being Lê Viết Lam, who was a business partner of Vingroup's founder - Phạm Nhật Vượng - in the Technocom instant noodle business they set up in Kharkiv, Ukraine. After establishing a supermarket, hotel and water park in Kharkiv, in 2007, Lam went back to Vietnam to build Sun Group's first Vietnamese theme park, Ba Na Hills.

Sun World 
Sun World is the entertainment brand of Sun Group and includes 7 different entertainment destinations: 

 Sun World Ba Na Hills
 Asia Park
 Sun World Fansipan Legend
 Sun World Halong Complex
 Sun World Hon Thom Nature Park
 Aquatopia Water Park 
 Exotica Village
 Kiss The Stars Show 
 Sun World BaDen Mountain
 Sun World CatBa Cable Car

Notable projects

See also
 Vinhomes
 Vingroup

References

External links
 

Real estate companies of Vietnam
Conglomerate companies of Vietnam
Vietnamese companies established in 2007